Demolition is the tearing-down of buildings and other structures.

Demolition may also refer to:

Film and television 
 Demolition (1978 film), an Australian TV film
 Demolition (2015 film), an American film starring Jake Gyllenhaal
 Demolition (TV series), a 2005 UK programme
 "Demolition" (The Young Ones), an episode of The Young Ones

Music

Albums
 Demolition (Dungeon album), 1996
 Demolition (Girlschool album), 1980
 Demolition (Judas Priest album), 2001
 Demolition (Ryan Adams album), 2002
 Demolition (Vektor album), 2005

Songs
 "Demolition", from the album Preservation Act 1 by the Kinks

Other uses in music
 Demolition Records, a defunct 21st-century UK recording label

Other uses 
 Demolition!, or The Demolished Man, a 1953 novel by Alfred Bester 
 Demolition (professional wrestling), a former WWF tag team
 Star Wars: Demolition, a 2000 vehicular combat video game

See also 
 "Demolición", a 1965 song by Los Saicos